Arothron is a genus in the pufferfish family Tetraodontidae found in warm parts of the Atlantic, Indian and Pacific Ocean. These species are sometimes kept in aquaria. The largest species is A. stellatus, which can reach  in length.

Species
There are currently 14 recognized species in this genus:

 Arothron caeruleopunctatus Matsuura, 1994 (Blue-spotted puffer)
 Arothron carduus (Cantor, 1849)
 Arothron diadematus (Rüppell, 1829) (Masked puffer)
 Arothron firmamentum (Temminck & Schlegel, 1850) (Starry puffer)
 Arothron gillbanksii (Clarke, 1897) 
 Arothron hispidus (Linnaeus, 1758) (White-spotted puffer)
 Arothron immaculatus (Bloch & J. G. Schneider, 1801) (Immaculate puffer)
 Arothron inconditus J. L. B. Smith, 1958 (Belly-striped puffer)
 Arothron leopardus (Day, 1989) (Banded leopardblowfish)
 Arothron manilensis (Marion de Procé, 1822) (Narrow-lined puffer)
 Arothron mappa (Lesson, 1831) (Map puffer)
 Arothron meleagris (Anonymous, referred to Lacépède, 1798) (Guineafowl puffer)
 Arothron multilineatus Matsuura, 2016 (Many-lined puffer)
 Arothron nigropunctatus (Bloch & J. G. Schneider, 1801) (Black-spotted puffer)
 Arothron reticularis (Bloch & J. G. Schneider, 1801) (Reticulated puffer)
 Arothron stellatus (Anonymous, referred to Lacépède, 1798) (Stellate puffer)

References

 
Ray-finned fish genera
Taxa named by Johannes Peter Müller